The St. Francis College Literary Prize is a biennial literary award inaugurated in 2009. The winner is selected by a jury and invited to St. Francis College in Brooklyn, New York, for a speech. The SFC Literary Prize is meant to offer encouragement and significant financial support to a mid-career writer. The winner of the prize is announced from a whittled down shortlist during the Brooklyn Book Festival every other year in September.

Winners and shortlist
Blue Ribbon = winner

2019
Jennifer Clement, Gun Love
Tsitsi Dangarembga, This Mournable Body
Brandon Hobson, Where the Dead Sit Talking
 Samantha Hunt, The Dark Dark
David Joy, The Line That Held Us
Danzy Senna, New People

Jury: Chris Abani, Kate Christensen, Ron Currie

2017
Amina Gautier, The Loss of All Lost Things
Mohsin Hamid, Exit West 
Adam Haslett, Imagine Me Gone
Selah Saterstrom, Slab
 Dana Spiotta, Innocents and Others
Deb Unferth, Wait Till You See Me Dance

Jury: Ellen Litman, Jeffery Renard Allen, René Steinke

2015
Paul Beatty, The Sellout
 Maud Casey, The Man Who Walked Away 
Stuart Dybek, Paper Lantern
David Gilbert, & Sons
Marlon James, A Brief History of Seven Killings
Rene Steinke, Friendswood

Jury: Sigrid Nunez, Erin McGraw, Daniel Torday

2013

Carol Anshaw, Carry the One
Jami Attenberg, The Middlesteins
Tony D'Souza, Mule
Christopher Tilghman, The Right-Handed Shore
 David Vann, Dirt

Jury: Jonathan Dee, Peter Cameron, Kate Christensen.

2011

For books published between July 2009 and May 2011.

Kevin Brockmeier, The Illumination
Joshua Cohen, Witz
 Jonathan Dee, The Privileges
Yiyun Li, Gold Boy Emerald Girl
Marlene van Niekerk, Agaat
Brad Watson, Aliens in the Prime of Their Lives

Jury: Francine Prose, Rick Moody, Darcey Steinke.

2009

 Aleksandar Hemon, Love and Obstacles
Chris Abani, Song For Night
Jim Krusoe, Girl Factory
Arthur Phillips, The Song Is You

Jury: Jonathan Lethem, Heidi Julavits, Ben Marcus, Ayelet Waldman, Michael Chabon.

References

External links 
St. Francis College Literary Prize official website.

 
American literary awards
Awards established in 2009
St. Francis College